Azohydromonas is a genus of bacteria from the family of Alcaligenaceae.

References

 

Burkholderiales
Bacteria genera